SLI may refer to:

Science and technology
 Scalable Link Interface, for connecting multiple video cards (Nvidia)
 Scan-Line Interleave, for connecting multiple video cards (3dfx)
 Safe Load Indicator in cranes
 Service Level Indicator
 Space Launch Initiative
 SLI battery, used in automotives
 Street light interference, a pseudoscientific idea
 Symmetric level-index arithmetic, in mathematics

Business and finance
SAP Labs India, the Indian subsidiary of SAP AG
SLI Systems, a software company in New Zealand
Supplemental Liability Insurance, for car rental
Swiss Leader Index, a market index
Sylvania Lighting International

Other
Sensory Logical Introvert
Specific language impairment
The Somerset Light Infantry, a former regiment in the British Army
Southwestern Louisiana Institute of Liberal and Technical Learning